Drummond is a village and special taxing district in Montgomery County, Maryland, United States.

The village was founded in 1903 and officially chartered in 1916. Approximately one-third mile long, the village consists of Drummond Avenue between Wisconsin Avenue and Little Falls Stream Valley Park.

The population was 120 as of 1990. There are 43 homes in the village.

The village is governed by a three-member Citizens' Committee.

References

External links

1903 establishments in Maryland
1916 establishments in Maryland
Populated places established in 1903
Populated places established in 1916
Villages in Maryland
Villages in Montgomery County, Maryland